Charles Spedding (born 19 May 1952 in Bishop Auckland, County Durham) is an English former long-distance runner.

Athletics career
Spedding was fourth in the 10,000 metres representing England, at the 1982 Commonwealth Games in Brisbane, Queensland, Australia. and was England's Amateur Athletic Association (AAA) 10,000 m champion in 1983 in a time of 28:08.12. His first marathon was the Houston Marathon in 1984, which he won by "the thickness of a vest".

Spedding followed this by winning the London Marathon in 1984 and the bronze medal for Great Britain in the marathon at the 1984 Summer Olympics held in Los Angeles, United States, finishing just 2 seconds behind silver medallist John Treacy. Although it was the first British Olympic marathon medal for 20 years, and the last won by Britain (male or female), the performance was one of 16 British medals in athletics that year, and it possibly did not get the recognition it deserved.

In 1985 he set a PB and English Marathon record of 2:08.33 (which stood until 2014) when he finished second behind Steve Jones in the London Marathon. He is the fourth fastest British marathon runner after Jones, Mo Farah and Callum Hawkins. He represented England in the marathon event, at the 1986 Commonwealth Games in Edinburgh, Scotland.

In 1987, he finished 8th in the London Marathon in 2:10.32. He also competed at the 1988 Summer Olympics in Seoul, South Korea, finishing 6th.

Post athletics
Spedding is a pharmacist by trade and worked in Ferryhill, County Durham. He is a real ale enthusiast and in 1976 co-founded the Durham brach of CAMRA. In September 2009, he published an autobiography of his running career called From Last to First.

He was awarded an Honorary Fellowship from the University of Sunderland in 2012.

In November 2019 he published a book Stop Feeding Us Lies: How Health and Happiness Come to Those Who Seek the Truth which examines dietary recommendations and lifestyle approaches which he analyses as being causes of high levels of obesity, type 2 diabetes and other illnesses.

Achievements

References

External links
 
 
 
 
 
 Charlie Spedding: We're running out of time for legacy in the Independent
 Article from 2003 in the Evening Chronicle
 From Last to First
 Power of 10 UK Men's Marathon Rankings
 Power of 10 Profile: Charlie Spedding
 Stop Feeding Us Lies

1952 births
Living people
Sportspeople from Bishop Auckland
English male marathon runners
Olympic athletes of Great Britain
Olympic bronze medallists for Great Britain
Athletes (track and field) at the 1984 Summer Olympics
Athletes (track and field) at the 1988 Summer Olympics
Commonwealth Games competitors for England
Athletes (track and field) at the 1982 Commonwealth Games
Athletes (track and field) at the 1986 Commonwealth Games
London Marathon male winners
People educated at Durham School
Alumni of the University of Sunderland
Olympic bronze medalists in athletics (track and field)
Medalists at the 1984 Summer Olympics